Coscombe may refer to:

John Coscombe
Lower Coscombe